Arbanitis raveni is a species of armoured trap-door spider in the family Idiopidae, and is endemic to New South Wales. 

It was first described by Wishart and Rowell in 2008 as Misgolas raveni, but was transferred to the genus, Arbanitis, by Michael Rix and others in 2017.

References

Idiopidae
Spiders described in 2008
Spiders of Australia
Fauna of New South Wales